The Dutch Eredivisie in the 1960–61 season was contested by 18 teams. Feijenoord won the championship.

League standings

Relegation/Promotion play-off

Elinkwijk were relegated to the Eerste Divisie.

Results

See also
 1960–61 Eerste Divisie
 1960–61 Tweede Divisie

References

 Eredivisie official website - info on all seasons 
RSSSF

Eredivisie seasons
Netherlands
1960–61 in Dutch football